Dame Care (German: Frau Sorge) is a 1928 German silent film directed by Robert Land and starring Fritz Kortner, Mary Carr and William Dieterle. It is based on the 1887 novel Frau Sorge by Hermann Sudermann.

The film's art direction was by Robert Neppach. It was distributed by the German branch of First National Pictures.

Cast
 Fritz Kortner as Der alte Meyhöfer  
 Mary Carr as Seine Frau  
 William Dieterle as Paul, der Sohn  
 Grete Mosheim as Käthe, die Tochter  
 Carl de Vogt as Baron Douglas  
 Hermine Sterler as Seine Frau  
 Vera Schmiterlöw as Elsbeth, die Tochter  
 Louis Ralph as Michael Raudszus, der Knecht 
 Anton Pointner as Fritz Erdmann  
 Max Hansen as Ulrich Erdmann

References

Bibliography
 Bock, Hans-Michael & Bergfelder, Tim. The Concise CineGraph. Encyclopedia of German Cinema. Berghahn Books, 2009.

External links

1928 films
Films of the Weimar Republic
Films directed by Robert Land
German silent feature films
Films based on works by Hermann Sudermann
German black-and-white films